Desulfonatronum thiodismutans is an alkaliphilic, sulfate-reducing bacterium capable of lithoautotrophic growth. It is Gram-negative, vibrio-shaped, with cells 0.6–0.7×1.2–2.7 μm in size, motile by a single polar flagellum. Its type strain is MLF1T (=ATCC BAA-395T =DSM 14708T).

References

Further reading

External links 
LPSN

Type strain of Desulfonatronum thiodismutans at BacDive -  the Bacterial Diversity Metadatabase

Bacteria described in 2003

Desulfovibrionales